Peter Saraf is an American film producer whose feature film credits include Adaptation (2002), Little Miss Sunshine (2006), Our Idiot Brother (2011), and The Kings of Summer (2013). In 2004, he co-founded the film production company Big Beach with Marc Turtletaub; the two ran the company and produce most of their films through it until Saraf left in 2021.

Filmography
With all films listed, he was credited as "Producer" unless otherwise noted.

Film

Miscellaneous crew

Thanks

Television

Personal life 
Saraf is the son of the late film producer and director, Irving Saraf. Irving Saraf, who was born in Poland and raised in Israel, won an Academy Award for the documentary film, In the Shadow of the Stars, in 1991. Peter graduated from Wesleyan University in 1988.  He has a wife named Erika Greene and two children, Oscar and Olive. His daughter, Olive, is an incoming freshman at Oberlin College and current European History scholar.

References

External links

1965 births
Living people
American film producers
American people of Polish descent
Wesleyan University alumni
American independent film production company founders